Formononetin is an O-methylated isoflavone.

Natural occurrences 
Formononetin is found in a number of plants and herbs such as red clover. Along with other phytoestrogens, it predominantly occurs in leguminous plants and Fabaceae, particularly in beans, such as green beans, lima beans, soy and many others, as the free aglycone or in form of its glucoside ononin.

It can also be found in Maackia amurensis cell cultures.

Pharmacodynamics 
Formononetin promotes angiogenesis. It is also involved in expressing the gene and proteins that are needed to make IgE.

Derivatives 
Ononin is the 7-O-β-D-glucopyranoside of formononetin.

References 

O-methylated isoflavones